Trond Vinterstø (born 28 December 1973) is a retired Norwegian football defender.

He started his youth career in Øygard and represented Norway as a youth international. In 1992 he transferred to Fyllingen. Managing promotion to the 1993 Tippeligaen, Vinterstø got 11 games there. His career was mostly spent in Nest-Sotra from 1994 through 2003.

After the 2003 season he packed up and moved to Grimstad. He did not play football until 2007, when he joined Jerv. In 2010 he went on to minnows Imås as player-coach.

References

1973 births
Living people
People from Fjell
Norwegian footballers
Fyllingen Fotball players
Nest-Sotra Fotball players
FK Jerv players
Eliteserien players
Norwegian First Division players
Association football defenders
Norway youth international footballers
Sportspeople from Vestland